Brunswick High School is located at 116 Maquoit Rd in Brunswick, Maine, United States. It is a part of the Brunswick School Department.

History 
Although a private school operated under the same name in the 1840s, Brunswick High School was founded as a public school in 1851 as a part of a school consolidation and restructuring effort. In its over 150-year history, the school has occupied three sites within Brunswick. The first high school was located within a larger school building at the corner of Federal and Green Streets (now 46 Federal Street). Hawthorne Elementary School was subsequently located at 46 Federal Street until its closure in 2010. Its most recent use is as the central office for the Brunswick School Department.

In 1938, a new high school building was planned by architect Harry S. Coombs and constructed with Works Progress Administration funds on the corner of Spring and McKeen Streets to the west of downtown Brunswick. In 1951, a one-story wing of classrooms was constructed off the southern portion of the western side of the original structure. A second floor of classrooms was added to this south wing in 1961, along with a new two-floor wing off the northern portion of the original building's western side. The new north wing mirrored the 1951 addition and created a courtyard. The two floors of the north wing provided more classrooms, a new gym, a cafeteria, a wood shop, science labs, and Home Economic rooms. By the 1990s the school was using temporary trailers as classrooms to deal with over-crowding and failed a state inspection. These and other factors contributed to the push to build a new school. The 1937 building and its additions later served temporarily as the location of Mount Ararat Middle School for the neighboring school district (School Administrative District #75) and was demolished in order to construct a new elementary school (Harriet Beecher Stowe School) at the site, which opened in 2011.

The current Brunswick High School building opened in 1995 at a new location at 116 Maquoit Road south of downtown Brunswick. In addition to providing expanded student capacity, the school contains a television in every classroom and a video announcement system. Crooker Theater, which includes an orchestra pit, hosts the school's performing arts programs. Brunswick High School has been accredited by the state of Maine and the New England Association of Schools and Colleges.

Classes are 85 minutes each with a five-minute break in between classes.

Athletics 

Brunswick High School, a member of the Kennebec Valley Athletic Conference, has won several state championships in both Class A and Class B (Football) competition.

 Boys' Basketball - 2002 
 Cheerleading - 1990 
 Girls' Cross Country - 2005–2007 
 Football - 1961, 2016 
 Boys' Lacrosse - 2007, 2015, 2017, 2018 
 Girls' Lacrosse - 2008-2009 
 Boys' Soccer - 1984–1986, 1990–1991, 1999, 2022
 Girls' Soccer - 2004, 2009 
 Boys' Swimming - 1961, 1965-1967 
 Girls' Swimming - 2000–2001, 2015-2016 
 Boys' Tennis - 1955/1956, 1962, 1996–1997, 1999 
 Girls' Tennis - 1997–1998, 2012–2013 
 Boys' Track (Indoor) - 1975(tie), 1991, 2008, 2010 
 Boys' Track (Outdoor) - 1959 (Class L), 1969 (Class LL), 1996, 2010 
 Girls' Track (Outdoor) - 1985 <ref name="auto5"

Notable alumni
 Mattie Daughtry, politician
 Mike Dumont, Navy vice admiral
 Bret Gilliam, technical diver and author
 Michael Lemelin, politician
 Stump Merrill, former baseball manager (New York Yankees)
 Ralph Mims, professional basketball player
 Matilda White Riley, gerontologist
 Aly Spaltro (Lady Lamb), musician
 Grant Tremblay, astrophysicist

Notable staff 

 Edwin Hall, physicist and former principal

References

Sources
 Wheeler, George Augustus. History of Brunswick, Topsham, and Harpswell, Maine: Including the Ancient Territory Known as Pejepscot. Brunswick, Maine: A. Mudge & Sons, 1878.

External links

BHS Official Website
GreatSchools.net

Public high schools in Maine
High schools in Cumberland County, Maine
Buildings and structures in Brunswick, Maine
Education in Brunswick, Maine